Banca Popolare del Lazio S.C.p.A. (BP Lazio), is an Italian cooperative bank based in Velletri, Lazio region.

History
The bank was founded in 1994 by the merger of Banca Popolare Pio X (founded 1904) and Banca Popolare di Terracina (founded 1954).

See also

 Banca Popolare del Frusinate, a Lazio-based bank
 Banca Popolare dell'Alto Lazio, a defunct bank

References

External links
  

Cooperative banks of Italy
Companies based in Lazio
Buildings and structures in the Metropolitan City of Rome Capital
Banks established in 1994
Italian companies established in 1994